Sawsan is a given name. Notable people with the name include:

 Sawsan al-Sha'er (born 1956), Bahraini journalist
 Sawsan Amer (born 1937), Egyptian painter
 Sawsan Badr (born 1957), Egyptian actress
 Sawsan Chebli (born 1978), German politician